Ultraviolet is a 2018 album by Kelly Moran, released on Warp. The album has received positive reviews.

Recording and release

Ultraviolet is the first release by Moran on Warp. Moran was inspired by the sounds of nature and tried to reproduce them on the recording. She went to the prepared piano she has used on 2017's Bloodroot and improved with the instrument, adding synthesizer later.

Music video
On April 8, 2018, Moran released the music video to "Water Music". Directed by Katharine Antoun, the video shows a montage of meditative abstract imagery: iridescent splashes of color produced by Turkish marbling, microscopic footage of cellular activity, Moran’s own face and hands, and an uncanny CGI blob. Andy Cush of Spin explained: "With deft editing, the visuals become more than screensaver-ish visual ambience, tracking the rising tension of the sounds with increasingly quick cuts between images."

Critical reception

 Pitchfork Media's Philip Sherburne gave the album 7.6 out of 10, summing up his review, "The excess is thrilling. It’s here where Moran feels the most unfettered and uninhibited—not just balancing opposing forces, but reveling in their collision and savoring the way the frequencies fly, like raindrops buffeted by gusts of wind." Evan Coral at Tiny Mix Tapes gave the album four out of five, with a review that is itself written in a post-modern style, highlighting Moran's inspiration from John Cage and emphasizing her innovation with a prepared piano. Paul Simpson of AllMusicGuide also referenced her innovation at piano preparation in his review, giving the album 3.5 out of five, saying the work is "far more expressive than one might expect from an album of prepared piano music". Regarding her inspiration to post-minimalism, Spyros Stasis of PopMatters ends his nine out of 10 review writing, "Starting from a minimal perspective, with a solitary piano as the main guide through this journey, she can awaken a pronounced ethereal and light characteristic, but further infuse it with a darker element." Exclaim!s Tom Beedham also gave it a nine out of 10 and contrasted the album's influences in his assessment: "Ultraviolet is indebted to the charm of the natural world, but with it, Moran unlocks dazzling new ones in the process, keys jammed firmly between the strings of her instrument".

Accolades

Track listing
All songs written by Kelly Moran
"Autowave" – 3:09
"Helix" – 8:48	
"Water Music" – 6:29
"Nereid" – 10:07
"In Parallel" – 6:20
"Halogen" – 7:15
"Radian" – 2:50

Personnel
Kelly Moran – piano, songwriting, production
Dina Chang at Setta Studio, New York City, New York, United States – photography
Katharine Hayden – digital retouching
Heba Kadry – mastering
Lafont London – graphic design
Daniel Lopatin – synthesizer and additional production on "Helix", "Water Music", and "Nereid"
Gabriel Schuman – engineering
Tim Saccenti at Setta Studio – photography, creative direction
Chris Tabron at Red Bull Studios, New York City, New York, United States – mixing

See also
List of 2018 albums

References

External links

2018 albums
Kelly Moran (musician) albums
Warp (record label) albums
Albums produced by Daniel Lopatin